The 1992 United States House of Representatives elections in Texas occurred on November 8, 1992, to elect the members of the state of Texas's delegation to the United States House of Representatives. Texas had thirty seats in the House, apportioned according to the 1990 United States Census. 

Intraparty conflict embroiled the Texas Democratic Party, who had gained complete control of Texas' government following Ann Richards' victory in the 1990 gubernatorial election. State Senator Eddie Bernice Johnson chaired the redistricting subcommittee and drew maps with the intention of creating minority-majority districts in Dallas for herself to run in. This drew the ire of representatives Martin Frost and John Wiley Bryant, whose districts would become considerably more White and Republican-leaning as a result. A majority-Hispanic district was also created in Houston alongside District 18, a majority-Black district. The Texas Legislature sided with Johnson's plan and adopted new congressional districts during a special session in 1991.

These elections occurred simultaneously with the United States Senate elections of 1992, the United States House elections in other states, the presidential election, and various state and local elections. As of 2020, this is the last time the Democratic Party won the popular vote in Texas's U.S. House races, though Democrats would continue to hold a majority of House seats until 2004.

Overview

Congressional Districts

District 1 
Incumbent Democrat Jim Chapman ran for re-election unopposed.

District 2 
Incumbent Democrat Charlie Wilson ran for re-election.

District 3 
Incumbent Republican Steve Bartlett resigned in 1991 after he was elected Mayor of Dallas. This prompted a special election to be held, which fellow Republican Sam Johnson won in a runoff. He ran for re-election.

District 4 
Incumbent Democrat Ralph Hall ran for re-election.

District 5 
Incumbent Democrat John Wiley Bryant ran for re-election.

District 6 
Incumbent Republican Joe Barton ran for re-election.

District 7 
Incumbent Republican Bill Archer ran for re-election unopposed.

District 8 
Incumbent Republican Jack Fields ran for re-election.

District 9 
Incumbent Democrat Jack Brooks ran for re-election.

District 10 
Incumbent Democrat J. J. Pickle ran for re-election.

District 11 
Incumbent Democrat Chet Edwards ran for re-election.

District 12 
Incumbent Democrat Pete Geren ran for re-election.

District 13 
Incumbent Democrat Bill Sarpalius ran for re-election. Beau Boulter, who held the seat until 1989, ran against him.

District 14 
Incumbent Democrat Greg Laughlin ran for re-election.

District 15 
Incumbent Democrat Kika de la Garza ran for re-election.

District 16 
Incumbent Democrat Ronald D. Coleman ran for re-election.

District 17 
Incumbent Democrat Charles Stenholm ran for re-election.

District 18 
Incumbent Democrat Craig Washington ran for re-election. The district was intentionally drawn to have an African-American majority population, but the methods used to draw this district would be found unconstitutional by the Supreme Court case Bush v. Vera in 1996.

District 19 
Incumbent Republican Larry Combest ran for re-election.

District 20 
Incumbent Democrat Henry B. González ran for re-election unopposed.

District 21 
Incumbent Republican Lamar Smith ran for re-election.

District 22 
Incumbent Republican Tom DeLay ran for re-election.

District 23 
Incumbent Democrat Albert Bustamante ran for re-election.

District 24 
Incumbent Democrat Martin Frost ran for re-election.

District 25 
Incumbent Democrat Michael A. Andrews ran for re-election.

District 26 
Incumbent Republican Dick Armey ran for re-election.

District 27 
Incumbent Democrat Solomon Ortiz ran for re-election.

District 28 
District 28 was created as a result of redistricting after the 1990 census.

District 29 
District 29 was created as a result of redistricting after the 1990 census. The district was intentionally drawn to have a Hispanic majority population, but the methods used to draw this district would be found unconstitutional by the Supreme Court case Bush v. Vera in 1996.

District 30 

District 30 was created as a result of redistricting after the 1990 census. The district was intentionally drawn to have an African-American majority population, but the methods used to draw this district would be found unconstitutional by the Supreme Court case Bush v. Vera in 1996. State Senator Eddie Bernice Johnson, the first African American woman ever elected to public office from Dallas, ran in the open race.

References

Texas
1992
1992 Texas elections